The Pixel 3a and Pixel 3a XL are a pair of Android smartphones designed, developed, and marketed by Google as part of the Google Pixel product line. They collectively serve as mid-range variants of the Pixel 3 and Pixel 3 XL. They were officially announced on May 7, 2019 at Google I/O, seven months after the announcement of the original Pixel 3 lineup, and were released on the same day. On August 3, 2020, it was succeeded by the Pixel 4a.

Specifications

Design 
The Pixel 3a and Pixel 3a XL come in three colors: 'Just Black' (all black), 'Clearly White' (white with an orange power button), and 'Purple-ish' (lavender, with a neon yellow power button). Both the Pixel 3a and the Pixel 3a XL resemble the smaller Pixel 3, following criticism of the Pixel 3 XL's notch. They look similar to their more expensive counterparts, but both have a polycarbonate unibody construction and Asahi Dragontrail glass, rather than Corning Gorilla Glass which is used on most other smartphones.

Hardware 
The Pixel 3a and Pixel 3a XL come with the Snapdragon 670 chip and 4GB of RAM, with 64GB of non-expandable eMMC internal storage.  Both phones lack wireless charging, water resistance and the Pixel Visual Core (PVC), all of which are standard on the Pixel 3.  They feature stereo speakers and a 3.5mm headphone jack, the latter of which was omitted on the Pixel 2 and Pixel 3. Unlike the Pixel 2 and Pixel 3, only one of the speakers is front-firing, with the other speaker on the bottom. A USB-C port is used on both for charging and connecting other accessories. Both phones also have Active Edge, where squeezing the sides of the phone activates Google Assistant, which debuted with the Pixel 2 and Pixel 2 XL.

Camera 
The Pixel 3a and Pixel 3a XL have a 12.2 megapixel rear camera, which is the same unit found on the Pixel 3, and a single 8 megapixel front-facing camera, lacking the second wide-angle sensor. They feature many of the same photography features as the Pixel 3. Some of these features of Google Camera include:
 Night Sight - dramatically improves low light performance with no flash or tripod.
 Astrophotography - Google updated the Pixel 3a with an improved Night Sight featuring an astrophotography mode.
 Super Res Zoom - employs super-resolution techniques to increase the resolution beyond what the sensor and lens combination would traditionally achieve using subtle shifts from handheld shake and optical image stabilization.
 Top Shot - takes a burst of HDR+ photos and automatically picks the best shots. An update added Top Shot for short videos.
 Google Lens - recognizes objects and text seen on the Pixel 3a's and Pixel 3a XL's camera.

The Pixel 3a's Google Photos capabilities are more restrictive than the Pixel 3, being limited to free "high quality" backups; full resolution images and videos count towards the Google Drive quota.

Software 
Pixel 3a and Pixel 3a XL ship with Android 9.0 Pie at launch and is upgradable to Android 12L with its last official software update released in September 2022, though third-party operating systems such as Ubuntu Touch can be installed.

The Pixel 3a and Pixel 3a XL were updated bringing several features from the Pixel 4 including: Live captions, Google Recorder, New Google Assistant, Astrophotography mode and Top Shot for short videos.

Models

Cellular networks

Reception 
The Pixel 3a's camera quality was highly praised, more so considering the device's price point, with Tom's Guide calling it "the new midrange benchmark" for cameras. Tom's Guide gave the Pixel 3a an Editor's Choice award and a rating of 4.5/5, concluding that it "has far and away the best camera, software and display you could ever hope to get in a $400 phone". The Verge was similarly positive, giving both the 3a and the 3a XL an 8/10, stating that "[it] takes photos that are nearly indistinguishable from what you get out of a Pixel 3". The battery life and build quality were praised as well, while reviewers were critical of the slower processor and lack of wireless charging and water resistance.

The 3a received an overall score of 101 from DxOMark (matching the iPhone XR and 1 point short of the Pixel 3), with a photo score of 103 and a video score of 98.

The 3a and 3a XL resulted in Google's smartphone sales doubling in the second quarter of 2019.

Issues
 Some users have reported that turning off Digital Wellbeing improves performance. The issue affects other Pixel devices as well, although Google claims Digital Wellbeing does not negatively affect performance.
 Pixel 3a and 3a XL have experienced power issues where some users have their phone randomly shut down.
 Manufacturing defects have also been found on some units, with crooked cutouts at the bottom for the speakers and USB-C port, the latter of which could potentially interfere with charging.

References

External links 
 

Android (operating system) devices
Discontinued smartphones
Google hardware
Google Pixel
Mobile phones introduced in 2019
Mobile phones with 4K video recording
Ubuntu Touch devices